Cagayan Valley Road is a  major highway that connects the cities and municipalities of the province of Cagayan, Philippines.

The road forms part of National Route 1 (N1), National Route 103 (N103) and National Route 101 (N101) of the Philippine highway network. Its segment from Lal-lo to Tuguegarao is also a component of the Pan-Philippine Highway, also known as Maharlika Highway and designated as Asian Highway 26 (AH26).

Route description 
Cagayan Valley Road is northernmost road in Cagayan that connects Aparri to Tuguegarao City, running in parallel to Cagayan River, the country's longest river. It also refers to the alternate name of Maharlika Highway that reaches south up to the Central Luzon province of Bulacan.

Aparri to Lal-lo
The road's Junction Aparri Airport–Port section starts as Loriga Gallarza Street at the Aparri Port in the northern coastal town of Aparri that also serves ferries to Batanes. It traverses the town proper and turns south as De Rivera Street. At the intersection with Rizal Street (Aparri Airport Road), N103 ends and the route number changes to N101, which it continues from the intersecting road. There, the road's Magapit–Aparri Road section commences. It then traverses the towns of Camalaniugan and Lal-lo.

Lal-lo to Tuguegarao

At the Magapit Interchange in Lal-lo, the road's route number transitions from N101 to AH26/N1 with the name Pan-Philippine Highway or Maharlika Highway as it continues its course to the south. It then traverses the towns of Gattaran, Alcala, Amulung, and Iguig. It enters the city of Tuguegarao, where it turns to the east at its intersection with Cagayan–Apayao Road/R. Balzain Highway (N51) and Tuguegarao Diversion Road II (N106). It then serves as an eastern radial road out of Tuguegarao as it diverts away from the city proper. Past Enrile Boulevard (N104), it enters the town of Peñablanca but turns away from the town proper as it would cross the Pinancauanan River back to Tuguegarao. It ends near the Cagayan–Isabela provincial boundary, where it continues as the Maharlika Highway, although the name is alternatively used up to its section in the Central Luzon province of Bulacan.

History 
Cagayan Valley Road was historically designated as Highway 5, which ran from Aparri to Bulacan, especially during the American colonial period. The highway's section from Lal-lo southwards later became part of the Pan-Philippine Highway beginning in the 1960s.

Intersections 

Magapit Suspension Bridge junction
Gattaran - inland barangay junction
Baggao - Alcala road
Iguig crossing
Tuguegarao junction

References 

Roads in Cagayan